The Writers' Trust Engel/Findley Award is a Canadian literary award, presented by the Writers' Trust of Canada to an established Canadian author to honour their body of work.

Presented for the first time in 2008 under the name Notable Author Award, the award was created by merging the formerly separate Marian Engel Award and Timothy Findley Award, which were presented to female and male nominees respectively. The award was subsequently renamed back to Engel/Findley.

The award is presented to one author, regardless of gender, annually. The award comes with a monetary prize of $25,000.

Winners

Marian Engel Award (1986-2007)
1986 - Alice Munro
1987 - Audrey Thomas
1988 - Edna Alford
1989 - Merna Summers
1990 - Carol Shields
1991 - Joan Clark
1992 - Joan Barfoot
1993 - Sandra Birdsell
1994 - Jane Urquhart
1995 - Bonnie Burnard
1996 - Barbara Gowdy
1997 - Katherine Govier
1998 - Sharon Butala
1999 - Janice Kulyk Keefer
2000 - Anita Rau Badami
2001 - Elizabeth Hay
2002 - Terry Griggs
2003 - Elisabeth Harvor
2004 - Dianne Warren
2005 - Gayla Reid
2006 - Caroline Adderson
2007 - Diane Schoemperlen

Timothy Findley Award (2002-2007)
2002 - Bill Gaston
2003 - Guy Vanderhaeghe
2004 - David Adams Richards
2005 - Rohinton Mistry
2006 - Douglas Glover
2007 - Michael Crummey

Engel/Findley Award (2008-present)
 2008 – Michael Winter
 2009 – David Bergen
 2010 – Miriam Toews
 2011 – Wayne Johnston
 2012 - Nino Ricci
 2013 - Lisa Moore
 2014 - Joan Thomas
 2015 - Annabel Lyon
 2016 - Eden Robinson
 2017 - Billie Livingston
 2018 - Alissa York
 2019 - Rawi Hage
 2020 - Kerri Sakamoto
 2021 - Cherie Dimaline
 2022 - Shani Mootoo

References

Writers' Trust of Canada awards
Awards established in 2008
2008 establishments in Canada
Literary awards honoring writers